Allen Yuan Xiangchen (1914 – August 16, 2005) was a Chinese Protestant Christian pastor. He was acclaimed by Open Doors as "a towering figure in China's house church movement" and known for his resistance against participation in the state-sanctioned Three-Self Patriotic Movement, which resulted in imprisonment for more than twenty-one years.

Ministry 
Yuan's ministry began in 1946, one year after the Japanese surrender. He was assisted by a Norwegian missionary. Yuan opened a prayer room in Beijing so that he could preach.

When the government set up the Three Self Patriotic Movement to organize churches under party control in 1950, a year after the communist revolution, Yuan and many other pastors refused to join. Along with Wang Ming-dao and Watchman Nee, in 1958 Yuan was arrested and sentenced to life in prison for "counter-revolutionary crimes."

Voice of the Martyrs quoted him speaking about his imprisonment at Heilongjiang, Northeast of China:Yuan was released in 1979 and started his own house church at Miaoying Temple (also known as White Stupa Temple). The house church became one of the largest house churches during his era, with two to three hundred attendees.

Personal life
He married Huizhen Lily Liang in 1938, and they had six children in total. He died on August 16, 2005, in Beijing, and some 2,500 mourners attended his funeral on Eight Treasure Mountain in Beijing.

See also
 Protestant missions in China
 Samuel Lamb

References

1914 births
2005 deaths
People from Bengbu
Chinese Protestants
Chinese Protestant ministers and clergy
Chinese prisoners sentenced to life imprisonment